Lapsana  is a genus of flowering plants in the family Asteraceae. It is native to Europe and northern Asia. Nipplewort is a common name for plants in this genus.

Species
Plant list
 Lapsana chondrilloides L.
 Lapsana communis L. 
 Lapsana crassifolia Vahl ex DC.
 Lapsana lampsanifolia Mill.
 Lapsana taraxacoides Forssk.
 Lapsana taraxaconoides J.F.Gmel.

References

Asteraceae genera
Cichorieae